1737 Severny, provisional designation , is a stony Eoan asteroid from the outer region of the asteroid belt, approximately 21 kilometers in diameter.

It was discovered on 13 October 1966, by Russian astronomer Lyudmila Chernykh at the Crimean Astrophysical Observatory in Nauchnyj, on the Crimean peninsula, who named after Soviet astronomer Andrei Severny.

Classification and orbit 

Severny is a member of the Eos family. It orbits the Sun in the outer main-belt at a distance of 2.9–3.2 AU once every 5 years and 3 months (1,908 days). Its orbit has an eccentricity of 0.05 and an inclination of 9° with respect to the ecliptic.

Physical characteristics 

Severny has been characterized as a common stony S-type asteroid.

Lightcurves 

A rotational lightcurve of Severny was obtained by French amateur astronomer Laurent Bernasconi in March 2005. It gave a rotation period of 14.11 hours with a brightness variation of 0.14 magnitude.

In September 2013, photometric observations in the R-band at the Palomar Transient Factory, California, gave a shorter period of 9.2481 hours with an amplitude of 0.17 magnitude.

Diameter and albedo 

According to the surveys carried out by the Infrared Astronomical Satellite IRAS, the Japanese Akari satellite, and NASA's Wide-field Infrared Survey Explorer with its subsequent NEOWISE mission, Severny measures between 21.33 and 24.83 kilometers in diameter, and its surface has an albedo between 0.136 and 0.181.

The Collaborative Asteroid Lightcurve Link assumes a standard albedo for Eoan asteroids of 0.14 and calculates a diameter of 21.40 kilometers with an absolute magnitude of 11.1.

Naming 

This minor planet was named by the discoverer in honor of Soviet astronomer Andrei Severny (1913–1987), who was the Director of the Crimean Astrophysical Observatory and known for his work on solar flares and astronomical observations from artificial satellites. The official  was published by the Minor Planet Center on 1 October 1969.

References

External links 
 Asteroid Lightcurve Database (LCDB), query form (info )
 Dictionary of Minor Planet Names, Google books
 Asteroids and comets rotation curves, CdR – Observatoire de Genève, Raoul Behrend
 Discovery Circumstances: Numbered Minor Planets (1)-(5000) – Minor Planet Center
 
 

001737
Discoveries by Lyudmila Chernykh
Named minor planets
19661013